Agrotis longidentifera, the brown cutworm, is a moth of the family Noctuidae described by George Hampson in 1903. It is found in eastern and southern Africa and several islands in the Indian Ocean.

The adults have a wing length of about 16 mm and the males have largely bipectinate (like a comb on both sides) antennas.

The larvae can cause extensive damage to germinating Zea mays (maize or corn) plants.

References

External links
 
 

Agrotis
Moths described in 1903
Moths of the Comoros
Moths of Africa
Moths of Madagascar
Moths of Réunion